Agonoxena argaula, or the coconut flat moth, is a moth of the family Agonoxenidae. It was first described by Edward Meyrick in 1921 from Fiji and is also known also from Guam, the New Hebrides, Tonga, Samoa, Ellice, Wallis, Futuna, and the Palmyra Atoll. It was first recorded in Hawaii in 1949. It is artificially spread by commerce.

It is the largest known species of the genus. Adults are yellowish brown with narrow pointed wings. The male moth bears a linear white mark on the forewings. There is much variation in the color and color pattern of the adults.

The larvae feed on Chrysalidocarpus lutescens, Cocos nucifera, Hyophorbe amaricaulis, Kentia and Pritchardia species. It is a pest of coconut and some other palms. During a heavy attack, several thousand larvae may infest a single palm tree. The feeding is confined to the epidermis on the underside of the leaves. The feeding scar of the young larva is long and narrow, spreading into wide, irregular blotches as the caterpillar grows. Feeding areas turn brown and are conspicuous. The caterpillar is yellowish green and 16–18 mm long. It feeds beneath a web.

Pupation takes place beneath a close, elongate, white web on either side of the upper or lower leaf surface.

External links

Agonoxeninae
Moths of Oceania